More Swinging Sounds is a jazz album by drummer Shelly Manne's group Shelly Manne & His Men, recorded in 1956 and released by the Contemporary label. Early releases of the album were labelled Vol 5, indicating it was the fifth volume of recordings released by the group.

Reception

The AllMusic review by Scott Yanow states: "Shelly Manne deserves great credit for being continually open to new directions and fresh material while staying on his own singular path".

Track listing
 "Moose the Mooche" (Charlie Parker) - 7:27
 "The Wind" (Russ Freeman) - 5:02
 "Pint of Blues" (Charlie Mariano) - 9:49
 "Tommyhawk" (Johnny Mandel) - 4:18
 "Quartet (A Suite in Four Parts)" (Bill Holman) - 15:38

Personnel
Shelly Manne & His Men
Shelly Manne - drums
Stu Williamson - trumpet, valve trombone
Charlie Mariano - alto saxophone
Russ Freeman - piano
Leroy Vinnegar - bass

References

1957 albums
Contemporary Records albums
Shelly Manne albums